Bloodhorse or Blood horse may refer to:
 Horse breeding (especially Thoroughbred horse breeding)
 The Blood-Horse and Bloodhorse.com, a magazine published by majority shareholder, The Jockey Club.
 Blood-Horse Publications, the publishing arm of The Jockey Club.
 Bloodhorse (band), a metal band from Boston, Massachusetts